A. N. M. Shamsul Islam is a Jatiya Party (Ershad) politician and the former Member of Parliament of Lakshmipur-1.

Career
Islam was elected to parliament from Lakshmipur-1 as a Jatiya Party candidate in 1986.

References

Jatiya Party politicians
Living people
3rd Jatiya Sangsad members
Year of birth missing (living people)